Millstadt is a village in St. Clair County, Illinois, United States, located at the crossing of Illinois Routes 163 (locally, "Jefferson Avenue") and 158 (locally, "Washington Avenue"). The village is known for its German heritage, with more than half its people of German descent. The population was 4,011 at the 2010 census, but a more recent study in July 2018 estimated the number at 3,885.

History
During a barn raising in 1836, it was proposed that a town be incorporated on land belonging to Henry Randleman. The name "Centerville" was proposed, as the site was equidistant from Belleville, Columbia, and Pittsburg Lake. The town was platted on March 13, 1837. In 1880, its name was changed to Millstadt, as the name Centreville was in use by another nearby town.

Another account (Millstadt School website):  "The story of how Millstadt developed out of 'Centerville' goes something like this. The current Centreville and our Centerville each had a post offices through which a great deal of mail became confused and mis-delivered. Our town's forefathers, upon applying for formal organization through the state, supposedly decided on the name 'Mittlestadt' or 'Middlestadt,' which means literally 'center city'; somehow the state misread the writing and sent back the papers reading 'Millstadt.' As you can guess, the governing group decided to keep that name as we had several mills at that time and the name fit."

In 1874, a German immigrant farm family was killed in a farming hamlet known as Saxtown, just south of the town.  It made national headlines and became the subject of the book The Ax Murders of Saxtown.

Demographics

As of the census of 2000, there were 2,794 people, 1,148 households, and 813 families residing in the village. The racial makeup of the village was 99% White, 0% Native American, 1% Asian, 0% from other races, and 0% from two or more races. Hispanic or Latino of any race were 0% of the population.

There were 1,148 households, out of which 31.8% had children under the age of 18 living with them, 59.1% were married couples living together, 8.9% had a female householder with no husband present, and 29.1% were non-families. 25.3% of all households were made up of individuals, and 12.5% had someone living alone who was 65 years of age or older. The average household size was 2.43 and the average family size was 2.92.

In the village, the population was spread out, with 23.7% under the age of 18, 7.6% from 18 to 24, 28.6% from 25 to 44, 22.9% from 45 to 64, and 17.3% who were 65 years of age or older. The median age was 39 years. For every 100 females there were 91.5 males. For every 100 females age 18 and over, there were 87.5 males.

The median income for a household in the village was $47,824, and the median income for a family was $56,378. Males had a median income of $40,893 versus $27,196 for females. The per capita income for the village was $21,914. About 3.2% of families and 4.0% of the population were below the poverty line, including 5.9% of those under age 18 and 5.1% of those age 65 or over.

Geography

The town center is formed by the intersection of two state highways. Illinois Route 158, or Washington Avenue, leads west to Columbia and east to Belleville. The other main street is Jefferson Avenue, the north part of which forms the southern end of Illinois Route 163, leading north to Centreville, where it intersects highways providing access to East St. Louis. The south end of Jefferson Avenue, as it leaves Millstadt, becomes Floraville Road.

Economy 
A 25.5-kW solar array on a barn at Magill Farms came into service in 2021.

Schools, churches, cemeteries

 Elementary schools:
 Millstadt Primary Center - 
 Millstadt Consolidated School - www.millstadt.stclair.k12.il.us
 St. James Catholic School - www.stjames.pvt.k12.il.us
 High schools: (all are in nearby Belleville, Illinois)
 Althoff Catholic High School - www.althoff.net
 Belleville High School-West - www.bths201.org
 Churches in Millstadt:
 Christian Assembly Church (non-denominational)
 Concordia United Church of Christ (United Church of Christ) - 
 Countryside Family Church
 St. James Catholic Church (Roman Catholic)
 Trinity Lutheran Church (Missouri Synod) - 
 Zion Evangelical Church (Evangelical Association) 
 Cemeteries:
 Millstadt Cemetery (aka Centreville Cemetery) 
 Mount Evergreen Cemetery 
 St. James Catholic Cemetery

Notable people 

 William N. Baltz, U.S. Representative and Millstadt mayor.
 Miles Dewey Davis Jr., father of jazz trumpeter Miles Davis
 Fred J. Kern, U.S. Representative
 Edward P. Petri, Illinois state representative, sheriff, and businessman
 Austin Seibert, kicker for the Detroit Lions, former Oklahoma Sooner, set record for most points by a kicker in FBS history
 Admiral Waldemar F. A. Wendt, United States Navy

Sister cities
 Groß-Bieberau (Germany)

See also
 Area code 618
 Roman Catholic Diocese of Belleville

References

External links
 * Village website
 Millstadt Township
 Millstadt Library
 Millstadt History & Research 2010
 Millstadt Chamber of Commerce

Villages in St. Clair County, Illinois
Populated places established in 1837
German-American culture in Illinois
German communities in the United States